Senator Rains or Raines may refer to:

Emory Rains (1800–1878), Texas State Senate
James S. Rains (1817–1880), Missouri State Senate
Omer Rains (born 1941), California State Senate
George Raines (1846–1908), New York State Senate
John Raines (1840–1909), New York State Senate